The Sacred Cod is a  carved-wood effigy of an Atlantic codfish, "painted to the life", hanging in the House of Representatives chamber of Boston's Massachusetts State House"a memorial of the importance of the Cod-Fishery to the welfare of this Commonwealth"
(i.e. Massachusetts, of which cod is officially the "historic and continuing symbol").
The Sacred Cod has gone through as many as three incarnations over three centuries: the first
(if it really existedthe authoritative source calling it a "prehistoric creature of tradition")
was lost in a 1747 fire; the second disappeared during the American Revolution; and the third, installed in 1784, is the one seen in the House chamber today.

"Sacred Cod" is not a formal name but a nickname which appeared in 1895, soon after the carving was termed "the sacred emblem" by a House committee appointed "to investigate the significance of the emblem [which] has kept its place under all administrations, and has looked upon outgoing and incoming legislative assemblies, for more than one hundred years".  Soon sacred cod was being used in reference to actual codfish as well, in recognition of the creature's role in building Massachusetts' prosperity and influence since early colonial times.

In 1933 the Sacred Cod was briefly "Cod-napped" by editors of the Harvard Lampoon, prompting police to drag the Charles River and search an airplane landing in New Jersey. 
In 1968 it was again taken briefly, this time by students at the University of Massachusetts Boston.

A fish figure is displayed in the State House Senate chamber as wella brass casting (sometimes called the Holy Mackerel) above its central chandelier.

Significance 

Codfishing was the first industry practiced by Europeans in Massachusetts, and it is said that the colony's first export was a cargo of fish.
Thus the codfish has been an important New England symbol for centuries, its image appearing on many early coins, stamps, corporate and government seals, and insignia such as the early crest of the Salem Gazette.
In 1743 a prominent Salem businessman built a mansion in which "the end of every
stair in his spacious hall [displayed] a carved and gilded codfish",
and in the 19th century the rich merchant families of New England were referred to as the "codfish aristocracy".

In the late 1920s an "amusing" (as author H. P. Lovecraft termed it)
codfish emblem appeared briefly, "totem-like",
on Massachusetts license plates.

History 

What is now called the Sacred Cod has hung for three centuriesthough with interruptions, and in at least two (and possibly three) successive incarnationsin the chamber of the Massachusetts House of Representatives (or its predecessor, the House of Assembly of the Province of Massachusetts Bay).

First Cod

Of the Cod's first incarnation, the Committee on History of the Emblem of the Codfish (appointed by the House in 1895) wrote:

Assuming it existed and whatever its origin (the Committee continued), when the State House burned in 1747 "this prehistoric creature of tradition... doubtless went up in a whirl of smoke which still clouds its history to the peering vision of the antiquarian."

Second Cod

A second Cod appeared sometime between 1748 (when the State House was rebuilt) and 1773 (when Thomas Crafts, Jr. billed the Province of Massachusetts Bay, "To painting Codfish, 15 shillings").
But within a few years, the Committee wrote, the second Cod

The Committee found "good reason to believe that this missing fish... was carved by one John Welch, a Boston patriot".

Third Cod

The third Cod was installed in 1784 (the Committee continued) after Representative John Rowenamesake of Rowes Wharf and "a leading spirit in the stirring scenes that led up to the famous 'Boston Tea Partyasked leave "to hang up the representation of a Cod Fish in the room where the House sit, as a memorial of the importance of the Cod-Fishery to the welfare of this Commonwealth, as had been usual formerly... And so the emblem was suspended" in the old State House once again, and this Cod (which Rowe may have underwritten personally) is the one extant today.

In 1798 the Cod was moved to the Representatives chamber in the new State House,
where it originally hung over the Speaker's desk. In the 1850s it was moved to the rear of the chamber.

Committee on History of the Emblem of the Codfish

On January2, 1895the House's last day of business before relocating to a new chamber in the same building 

Accordingly, after "nearly two months of painstaking research and investigation" the three-member Committee on History of the Emblem of the Codfish submitted its report, and after debating "at length" the House ordered "immediate removal of the ancient 'representation of a codfish' from its present position in the chamber recently vacated by the House, and to cause it to be suspended... in this chamber..."

The Sacred Cod was wrapped in an American flag, placed on a bier, andescorted by the Sergeant-at-Armsborne by House messengers to the new House chamber, where the assembled Representatives rose in applause. 
After repainting by Walter M. Brackett, it was hung where it remains today:
"between the two sets of central columns, and under the names 'Motley,' and 'Parkman',"
above the chamber's clock.

The Cod has faced north (left as seen from the Speaker's rostrum) since its installation in the House chamber in 1895, though after being repainted in 1965 it was, at least temporarily, rehung the other way.

"Sacred Cod" nickname

The Committee's report refers at one point to "the sacred emblem",
and while it was working a poem appeared in the Boston Globe referring to the carving as "the Sacred Cod".
Within a few years authors, journalists, and advertiserseven those far from New Englandwere using the term routinely.
The phrase quickly came to refer not only to the wooden Cod in the State House but to flesh-and-blood cod from the sea as well, especially as an item of commerce.
At the 1908 convention of the Retail Grocers of the United States, held in Boston, one delegate recalled

Two years later the New Hampshire Board of Agriculture, bemoaning the counterfeiting of foodstuffs "famous for their distinctive properties or superior quality", warned that "haddock, hake, pollock, cusk, etc., are substituted indiscriminately in place of the sacred cod."
In 1912 President William Howard Taft, in Boston, addressed a journalists' banquet in New York City "by long distance telephone from the home of the sacred cod".
And in 1922 historian Samuel Eliot Morison, emphasizing fishing's vital role in the colonial economy, wrote that "Puritan Massachusetts derived her ideals from a sacred book; her wealth and power from the sacred cod."

The famous doggerel poking fun at Boston's Brahmins

paraphrases an earlier poem now little remembered:

"Cod-napping" and other incidents

Harvard Lampoon

In an incident now referred to as "The Cod-napping" by State House officials,
on the evening of April26, 1933, members of the Harvard Lampoon (the Harvard College humor magazine) entered the House of Representatives gallery, cut down the Cod, and carried it away in an unusually large florist's box equipped with protruding decoy lilies.

which reckoned the Cod's value to be "something less than nothing. As an object of art it is worthless"Massachusetts officials were "shocked into a condition bordering on speechlessness" by the theft,
"some legislators holding that it would be sacrilege to transact business without the emblem of the Commonwealth looking down upon them."
(Nonetheless, at the appointed time "[House] Speaker [Leverett] Saltonstall looked mournfully at the vacant place and then banged the gavel."
Barnstable County offered the loan of its own codfish emblem for the duration of the crisis.)

Meanwhile, Boston mayor James Michael Curley received a telephone message: "Tell the Mayor that when the Sacred Cod is returned it will be wrapped in the municipal flag, now flying in front of City Hall. Try and catch us when we cop the flag. Lafayette Mulligan, we are here."
"Indignant" police dragged the Charles River and, acting on a tip that a Lampoon editor had flown to New Jersey with the Cod, had the plane searched on landing; the tip turned out to be a red herring.
Detectives followed "scores" of clues, one of which took them to a Cambridge box factory and from there to "collegiate circles"a "6-foot youth" (tall enough to reach the wires suspending the Cod) had reportedly bought lilies from a Harvard-area florist before being seen in the State House on the day of the theftand several Harvard College students were questioned by the school's dean.
"So much general interest was provoked that The Boston Transcript indulged in two columns of news, hearsay, and speculation upon the missing emblem," the Times further reported,
later referring to the Cod as Boston's "Palladium".

Eventually a mysterious telephone call directed Harvard official Charles R. Apted to West Roxbury, where he was met by an automobile which he followed into some woods; there two young men, with collars up and hatbrims down, handed him the Cod (not wrapped in any flag) before speeding away.
In the early hours of April29, after repairs to three damaged fins, the Sacred Cod was re-hung in the House chamber, "six inches [15cm] higher [than] the reach of any individual. A stepladder will be needed to remove it in the future."

University of Massachusetts

Using a stepladder, on November14, 1968, students at the new Boston campus of the University of Massachusetts took the Sacred Cod in protest of perceived legislative indifference to their school.
("Sacred Cod gone from House perch", the Boston Globe alerted its readers.)<ref
name="globe01">

</ref>
It was found days later in a little-used State House hallway.

Greyhound replacement proposal

In 1937 Representative John B. Wenzler offered a facetious proposal "that the sacred cod be immediately removed [from the House chamber], and a greyhound substituted in its place, as the 1937 Legislature has shown itself to be completely under the power of the dog track operators."
Apted (whom the Boston Globe referred to as "Harvard Cop No.1") wrote to Wenzler: "As one who is, and was, very much interested in preserving [the Cod's] dignity, and furthermore having held it in my arms... I most respectfully ask a favor, that is: If the greyhound be substituted, that I be presented with the cod in order that it may be preserved for the future of young Americans."

World War II
After the House of Representatives moved to its new chamber in 1895, the Massachusetts Senate, which took over the old House chamber, incorporated a fish figure
(often dubbed the Holy Mackerel)
into the chandelier there, as a reminder of the Sacred Cod the Representatives had taken with them.
When officials of the World War II aluminum-for-defense drivemisinformed that the Sacred Cod was aluminumasked that it be donated to the war effort, House Speaker Christian Herter explained that the Cod had been created decades before aluminum's discovery, and suggested that the Holy Mackerel be considered for sacrifice instead.

Notes

Sources and further reading

Further reading

Other sources cited

1784 sculptures
Animal monuments
Fish in art
Landmarks in Boston
Massachusetts culture
Monuments and memorials in Boston
Wooden sculptures in Massachusetts